Maccaffertium mediopunctatum is a species of flat-headed mayfly in the family Heptageniidae. It is found in Southeastern Canada and the Eastern United States.

Subspecies
These two subspecies belong to the species Maccaffertium mediopunctatum:
 Maccaffertium mediopunctatum arwini (Bednarik and McCafferty, 1979) i g
 Maccaffertium mediopunctatum mediopunctatum (McDunnough, 1926) i g b
Data sources: i = ITIS, c = Catalogue of Life, g = GBIF, b = Bugguide.net

References

Further reading

External links

 

Mayflies
Articles created by Qbugbot
Insects described in 1926